Charles Henry Brown (March 7, 1904 – April 26, 1959) was an American lawyer and politician who served as speaker of the Vermont House of Representatives.

Early life
Charles Henry Brown was born in Whiting, Vermont, on March 7, 1904. He graduated from Brandon High School and received a Bachelor of Arts degree from the University of New Hampshire in 1926. While at UNH, Brown participated in the Reserve Officer Training Corps program.

After college, Brown studied at the University of Michigan Law School, passed the bar, and established a practice in Brandon.

Career 
A Republican, Brown served in local offices including town agent and town grand juror. He served in the Vermont House of Representatives from 1949 to 1951.

In 1952, Brown was again elected to the Vermont House and served three terms, 1953 to 1959. He was speaker of the House in his final term, 1957 to 1959.

Brown was appointed Secretary of Civil and Military Affairs (chief assistant) to Governor Robert Stafford in 1959.

Personal life 
Brown died unexpectedly in Waltham, Massachusetts, on April 26, 1959. He was buried at Pine Hill Cemetery in Brandon.

References 

1904 births
1959 deaths
University of New Hampshire alumni
University of Michigan Law School alumni
Vermont lawyers
People from Brandon, Vermont
Republican Party members of the Vermont House of Representatives
Speakers of the Vermont House of Representatives
20th-century American lawyers
20th-century American politicians
People from Whiting, Vermont